Adolfi is an Italian surname. Notable people with the surname include:

 Ciro Adolfi (1683–1758), Italian painter
 Giacomo Adolfi (1682–1741), Italian painter
 John G. Adolfi (1888–1933), American film director, actor, and screenwriter

Italian-language surnames
Patronymic surnames
Surnames from given names